Hit and Run is the second studio album by the British heavy metal band Girlschool, released in 1981 on Bronze Records.

Overview

The album represented Girlschool's sophomore effort, and like its predecessor Demolition (1980) it was recorded at Jackson's Studios, England. The band were in the studio from December 1980 to January 1981 with Vic Maile again serving as producer.

Hit and Run is the most successful Girlschool album, having reached No. 5 in the UK Albums Chart, with the single of the title track climbing to No. 32 in the UK Singles Chart. The band appeared on the BBC show Top of the Pops on April 16, 1981, miming to the hit song. The 7-inch single (Bronze BRO 118) had "Tonight" as B-side, with the 10-inch adding the cover version of the famous ZZ Top song "Tush". Lead track "C'mon Let's Go" was featured in the Gemini Award winning 2005 documentary film Metal: A Headbanger's Journey.

The car on the cover is a 1972 Buick Riviera.
	
The album was reissued on CD in 2004 by Castle, a subsidiary of Sanctuary Records, with bonus tracks and extensive sleevenotes by Record Collector'''s Joe Geesin.

Critical reception

In 2005, Hit and Run was ranked number 289 in Rock Hard magazine's book The 500 Greatest Rock & Metal Albums of All Time.

 Track listings 

 Other Versions Hit and Run did not get a proper release in North America. Instead compilation albums featuring the title and artwork from Hit and Run, and tracks from both Demolition and Hit and Run, were released. Canada and the United States each received their own unique releases.

In the United States Stiff Records released an album titled Hit and Run'' on both vinyl and cassette.

The Canadian release was put out by Solid Gold Records and featured the same songs as the American release, however the order of the tracks was different.

Personnel
Band members
 Kim McAuliffe – rhythm guitar, vocals on track 4
 Kelly Johnson – lead guitar, vocals on tracks 1, 2, 7, 11, 12
 Enid Williams – bass, vocals on tracks 3, 5, 6, 8, 9, 10, 13, 14
 Denise Dufort – drums

Production
Vic Maile – producer, engineer, mixing

Release history

Charts

Certifications

References

External links 
 Official Girlschool discography

Girlschool albums
1981 albums
Albums produced by Vic Maile
Bronze Records albums
Stiff Records albums